Ectopatria pelosticta is a moth of the family Noctuidae. It is found in New South Wales, Queensland, South Australia and Western Australia.

External links
Australian Faunal Directory

Moths of Australia
Noctuinae
Moths described in 1902